Plumas, California may refer to:
Plumas County, California

See also
 Plumas (disambiguation)